The Israeli Presidential Medal of Honor (Itur Nesi Medinat Yisra'el) is the highest civil medal given by the President of the State of Israel.

History
The President's Medal was first presented on March 1, 2012, in Beit HaNassi by President of Israel, Shimon Peres. In total, he awarded it to 26 people "who have made an outstanding contribution to the State of Israel or to humanity, through their talents, services, or in any other form." The medal, based on the French Légion d'Honneur, was designed by Yossi Matityahu and includes a verse from the Book of Samuel, which loosely translates as "head and shoulders [above the rest].

President Isaac Herzog revived the institution of the medal in 2022, awarding it for the first time since Shimon Peres in 2014. Under Herzog, the decoration was renamed the Israeli Presidential Medal of Honor. Recipients include Czech President Miloš Zeman and U.S. President Joe Biden.

Recipients 
Henry Kissinger, 2012
Judith Feld Carr, 2012
Rashi Foundation, 2012
Rabbi Adin Steinsaltz (Even-Israel), 2012
Zubin Mehta, 2012
Ory Slonim, 2012
Barack Obama, 2013
Bill Clinton, 2013
Elie Wiesel, 2013
Rabbi Yitzchak Dovid Grossman, 2014
Steven Spielberg, 2013
Lia Van Leer, 2014
Avi Naor, 2014
Rabbi Avraham Elimelech Firer, 2014
Brig.-Gen. Avigdor Kahalani, 2014
Avner Shalev, 2014
Dr. Harry Zvi Tabor, 2014
Jack Mahfar, 2014
Angela Merkel, 2014
Giorgio Napolitano, 2014
Ruth Dayan, 2014
Stef Wertheimer, 2014
Kamal Mansour, 2014
Rabbi Israel Meir Lau, 2014
Prof. Reuven Feuerstein, 2014
Miloš Zeman, 2022
Joe Biden, 2022
Nicos Anastasiades, 2022

References

Orders, decorations, and medals of Israel
Awards established in 2012
2012 establishments in Israel